Sucking lice (Anoplura, formerly known as Siphunculata) have around 500 species and represent the smaller of the two traditional superfamilies of lice. As opposed to the paraphyletic chewing lice, which are now divided among three suborders, the sucking lice are monophyletic.

The Anoplura are all blood-feeding ectoparasites of mammals. They only occur on about 20% of all placentalian mammal species, and are unknown from several orders of mammals (Monotremata, Edentata, Pholidota, Chiroptera, Cetacea, Sirenia, and Proboscidea). They can cause localized skin irritations and are vectors of several blood-borne diseases. Children appear particularly susceptible to attracting lice, possibly due to their fine hair.

At least three species or subspecies of Anoplura are parasites of humans; the human condition of being infested with sucking lice is called pediculosis. Pediculus humanus is divided into two subspecies, Pediculus humanus humanus, or the human body louse, sometimes nicknamed "the seam squirrel" for its habit of laying of eggs in the seams of clothing, and Pediculus humanus capitis, or the human head louse. Pthirus pubis (the human pubic louse) is the cause of the condition known as crabs.

Families
These 15 families are generally recognized in the Anoplura:
 Echinophthiriidae Enderlein, 1904 – (seal lice)
 Enderleinellidae Ewing, 1929
 Haematopinidae Enderlein, 1904 – (ungulate lice)
 Hamophthiriidae Johnson, 1969
 Hoplopleuridae Ewing, 1929 – (armoured lice)
 Hybophthiridae Ewing, 1929
 Linognathidae Webb, 1946 – (pale lice)
 Microthoraciidae Kim & Lugwig, 1978
 Neolinognathidae Fahrenholz, 1936
 Pecaroecidae von Kéler, 1963
 Pedicinidae Enderlein, 1904 – (Old World monkey lice)
 Pediculidae Leach, 1817 – (body lice)
 Polyplacidae Fahrenholz, 1912 – (spiny rat lice)
 Pthiridae Ewing, 1929 – (pubic lice)
 Ratemiidae Kim & Lugwig, 1978

See also 
 Use of DNA in forensic entomology

References

External links 

 Solenopotes capillatus, little blue cattle louse on the UF / IFAS Featured Creatures Web site
 VectorBase homepage for Pediculus humanus (genome browser, downloads and more)

Lice